Olst is a railway station located in Olst, Olst-Wijhe, the Netherlands. The station was opened on 1 October 1866 and is located on the Deventer - Zwolle section of the Arnhem–Leeuwarden railway. The train services are operated by Nederlandse Spoorwegen. The station lies in the centre of Olst. The station was closed between 15 May 1936 and 1 June 1940.

Train services
, the following train services call at this station:
2× per hour express Intercity service: Zwolle - Deventer - Arnhem - Nijmegen - 's-Hertogenbosch - Roosendaal

Bus service
There is a bus stop near the station on the Jan Schamhartstraat called Centrum.

 161 - Deventer - Diepenveen - Boskamp - Olst - Den Nul -Wijhe - Windesheim - Ittersum - Zwolle

References

External links
NS website 
Dutch Public Transport journey planner 

Railway stations in Overijssel
Railway stations opened in 1866
Railway stations on the Staatslijn A
Railway stations on the IJssellijn
1866 establishments in the Netherlands
Olst-Wijhe
Railway stations in the Netherlands opened in the 19th century